Viduše is a village in the municipality of Mavrovo and Rostuša, North Macedonia.

Demographics
Viduše has traditionally been inhabited by a Muslim Macedonian (Torbeš) population.

According to the 2002 census, the village had a total of 185 inhabitants. Ethnic groups in the village include:

Macedonians 152
Turks 24 
Albanians 9

References

External links

Villages in Mavrovo and Rostuša Municipality
Macedonian Muslim villages